The Man in Hobbles is a 1928 American silent comedy film directed by George Archainbaud and starring John Harron, Lila Lee and Lucien Littlefield. The film's sets were designed by the art director Hervey Libbert.

Cast
 John Harron as Joe Coleman 
 Lila Lee as Ann Harris 
 Lucien Littlefield as Pa Harris 
 Betty Westmore as Gertie Harris 
 Edward J. Nugent as Jake Harris 
 William Anderson as Elmer Harris 
 Vivien Oakland as Mrs. Maynard 
 Sunshine Hart as Ma Harris

References

Bibliography
 Bruce Babington & Charles Barr. The Call of the Heart: John M. Stahl and Hollywood Melodrama. Indiana University Press, 2018.

External links

1928 films
1928 comedy films
Silent American comedy films
Films directed by George Archainbaud
American silent feature films
1920s English-language films
Tiffany Pictures films
American black-and-white films
1920s American films